Samsjøen may refer to:

Places
Samsjøen (Trøndelag), a lake in Midtre Gauldal and Melhus municipalities in Trøndelag county in Norway
Samsjøen (Ringerike), a lake in Ringerike and Jevnaker municipalities in Buskerud and Oppland counties in Norway